Molla may refer to:

People
 Abdul Quader Molla (1948–2013), Bangladeshi Islamist leader, writer and politician convicted and executed for war crimes
 Abdur Razzak Molla (born 1944), Indian politician
 Atukuri Molla (1440–1530), Telugu poet
 Gaetano Molla (1845–1894), Italian impresario, conductor, pianist and opera director
 Getaneh Molla (born 1994), Ethiopian long-distance runner
 Gianna Beretta Molla (1922–1962), Italian Roman Catholic pediatrician who refused a life-threatening abortion and a hysterectomy
 Giasuddin Molla (born 1956), Indian politician
 Jordi Mollà (born 1968), Spanish actor
 José Mollá (born 1967), Argentine businessman
 Manik Hossain Molla (born 1999), Bangladeshi footballer
 Moslem Ali Molla, East Pakistan member of parliament
 Oleg Molla (born 1986), Moldovan footballer
 Rahamatulla Molla (born 1987), Indian former athlete
 Saokat Molla (born 1971), Indian politician
 Shlomo Molla (born 1965), Israeli politician
 Solomon Molla (born 1987), Ethiopian athlete
 Zaman Molla (born 1979), Iranian former table tennis player
 Molla Mallory (1884–1959), Norwegian tennis player
 Molla Wagué (born 1991), Malian footballer

Other uses
 Molla, Markazi, a village in Markazi Province, Iran
 Mullah (Islamic clergy), alternative spelling 
 Molla (skipper), a skipper butterfly genus